The Speaker of the North Carolina House of Representatives is the presiding officer of one of the houses of the North Carolina General Assembly. The Speaker is elected by the members of the house when they first convene for their regular session, which is currently in January of each odd-numbered year. Perhaps the most important duty of the Speaker is to appoint members and chairs of the various standing committees of the House.

History of the office 
The office evolved from the office of Speaker of the lower house of the legislature in the Province of Carolina, called the House of Burgesses. Since the House was the only elected body in the colony, the Speaker was often seen as the leading voice of the people.  In 1776, North Carolina created its first constitution, which established a Senate and a House of Commons, both of which were elected by voters. In the 1868 North Carolina Constitution, the name of the house was changed to "House of Representatives."

For most of the twentieth century, the office's power was limited, because Speakers usually only served for a single legislative session. This changed with Speakers Carl J. Stewart, Jr. (1977–1980), Liston B. Ramsey (1981–1988) and James B. Black (1999–2006).

Democrats held the speaker's chair continuously from 1899 until 1994, when Republicans gained a majority and elected Harold J. Brubaker in January 1995.

In the 2003–2004 session, a unique power-sharing arrangement was created by Democrats and a handful of Republicans. This resulted in the first election of two speakers simultaneously, Jim Black (Democrat) and Richard T. Morgan (Republican). The two held roughly equal power and took turns presiding over the House. After Democrats won a majority in the 2004 election, this arrangement was ended, but Morgan again supported Black and was named Speaker Pro Tempore.

Powers and duties 

The speaker has the power to appoint some members of state boards.

List of speakers

Speakers of the House of Burgesses
The following were speakers of the House of Burgesses during the Province of Carolina and Province of North Carolina periods:
George Catchmaid 1666
Valentine Bird 1672–73
Thomas Eastchurch 1675
Thomas Cullen 1677
George Durant 1679
John Nixon 1689
John Porter 1697–98
William Wilkison 1703
Thomas Boyd 1707
Edward Moseley 1708
Richard Sanderson 1709
William Swann 1711
Thomas Snoden 1711–12
Edward Moseley 1715–23
Maurice Moore 1725
John Baptista Ashe 1726
Thomas Swann 1729
Edward Moseley 1731–34
William Downing 1735–39
John Hodgson 1739–41
Samuel Swann 1742–54
John Campbell 1754 – c. 1760
Samuel Swann c. 1760–62
John Ashe 1762–65
John Harvey 1766–69
Richard Caswell 1770–71
John Harvey 1773–75

Speakers of the House of Commons

The following members were elected speakers of the House of Commons in the state of North Carolina:
Abner Nash 1777
John Williams 1778
Thomas Benbury 1778–82
Edward Starkey 1783
Thomas Benbury 1784 (April)
William Blount 1784 (October)
Richard Dobbs Spaight 1785
John Baptista Ashe 1786–87
John Sitgreaves 1787–88
Stephen Cabarrus 1789–93
John Leigh 1793–94
Timothy Bloodworth 1794–95
John Leigh 1795–96
Mussenden Ebenezer Matthews 1797–99
Stephen Cabarrus 1800–05
John Moore 1806
Joshua Grainger Wright 1807–08
William Gaston 1808
Thomas Davis 1809
William Hawkins 1810–11
William Miller 1812–14
John Craig 1815
Thomas Ruffin 1816
James Iredell, Jr. 1816–18
Romulus M. Saunders 1819–20
James Mebane 1821
John D. Jones 1822
Alfred Moore 1823–25
John Stanly 1825–27
James Iredell, Jr. 1827–28
Thomas Settle 1828–29
William Julius Alexander 1829–30 (D)
Charles Fisher 1830–32
Louis D. Henry 1832–33
William Julius Alexander 1833–35 (D)
William H. Haywood, Jr. 1835–37 (D)
William A. Graham 1838–40 (W)
Robert B. Gilliam 1840–41 (W)
Calvin Graves 1842–43 (D)
Edward Stanly 1844–47 (W)
Robert B. Gilliam 1846–49 (W)
James C. Dobbin 1850–51 (D)
John Baxter 1852 (W)
Samuel P. Hill 1854–55 (D)
Jesse G. Shepherd 1856–57 (D)
Thomas Settle, Jr. 1858–59 (D)
William T. Dortch 1860–61 (D)
Nathan N. Fleming 1861
Robert B. Gilliam 1862–63
Richard Spaight Donnell 1863
Marmaduke Swain Robins (1863)
William E. Mann (1863)
Richard Spaight Donnell 1864–65
Samuel F. Phillips 1865–66
Rufus Yancey McAden 1866–67

Speakers of the House of Representatives
The following members were elected speaker of the House of Representatives:
Joseph W. Holden 1868–70 (R)
William Armistead Moore 1870 (R)
Thomas J. Jarvis 1870–72 (D)
James L. Robinson 1872–75 (D)
Charles Price 1876–77 (D)
John M. Moring 1879 (D)
Charles M. Cooke 1881 (D)
George M. Rose 1883 (D)
Thomas Michael Holt 1885 (D)
John R. Webster 1887 (I)
Augustus Leazar 1889 (D)
Rufus A. Doughton 1891 (D)
Lee S. Overman 1893 (D)
Zeb V. Walser 1895 (R)
A. F. Hileman 1897 (Populist)
Henry G. Connor 1899–1900 (D)
Walter E. Moore 1901 (D)
S. M. Gattis 1903 (D)
Owen H. Guion 1905 (D)
E. J. Justice 1907 (D)
A. W. Graham 1909 (D)
W. C. Dowd 1911 (D)
George Whitfield Connor 1913 (D)
Walter Murphy 1913 (D)
Emmett R. Wooten 1915 (D)
Walter Murphy 1917  (D)
Dennis G. Brummitt 1919 (D)
Harry P. Grier 1921 (D)
John G. Dawson 1923–24 (D)
Edgar W. Pharr 1925 (D)
Richard T. Fountain 1927 (D)
A. H. Graham 1929 (D)
Willis Smith 1931 (D)
R. L. Harris 1933 (D)
Robert Johnson 1935–36 (D)
R. Gregg Cherry 1937 (D)
D. L. Ward 1939 (D)
O. M. Mull 1941 (D)
John Kerr Jr. 1943 (D)
Oscar L. Richardson 1945 (D)
Thomas J. Pearsall 1947 (D)
Kerr Craig Ramsay 1949 (D)
W. Frank Taylor 1951 (D)
Eugene T. Bost, Jr. 1953 (D)
Larry I. Moore, Jr. 1955–56 (D)
James K. Doughton 1957 (D)
Addison Hewlett 1959 (D)
Joseph M. Hunt, Jr. 1961 (D)
H. Clifton Blue 1963 (D)
Hoyt Patrick Taylor, Jr. 1965–66 (D)
David M. Britt 1967 (D)
Earl W. Vaughn 1969 (D)
Philip P. Godwin 1971 (D)
James E. Ramsey 1973–74 (D)
James C. Green 1975–76 (D)
Carl J. Stewart, Jr. 1977–80 (D)
Liston B. Ramsey 1981–88 (D)
Josephus L. Mavretic 1989–90
Daniel T. Blue, Jr. 1991–94 (D)
Harold J. Brubaker 1995–98 (R)
James B. Black 1999–2002 (D)
James B. Black 2003–2004 (Co-Speaker or "Democratic Speaker")
Richard T. Morgan 2003–2004 (Co-Speaker or "Republican Speaker")
James B. Black 2005–2006 (D)
Joe Hackney 2007–2010 (D)
Thom Tillis 2011–2015 (R)
Tim Moore 2015–present (R)

House notes

See also

Speaker (politics)
President Pro Tempore of the North Carolina Senate

References

Structure of the North Carolina General Assembly
North Carolina Manual. Published by the North Carolina Secretary of State.

Works cited 
 

North Carolina House of Representatives
Members of the North Carolina House of Burgesses
1666 establishments in the Thirteen Colonies
Lists of North Carolina politicians